WPCR - PortClintonRadio.com is a radio station that serves Port Clinton, Ohio, United States, and the surrounding Ottawa County area and was one of the first radio stations to be heard exclusively on the internet with 24/7 programming. Programming includes contemporary hits, oldies, classic rock and several talk radio programs. WPCR is an acronym for We're Port Clinton Radio.

History
In May 2008, Greg Peiffer retired after thirty years running of Tri-County Broadcasting, Inc, a two-station traditional AM/FM broadcast facility serving Findlay and Fostoria, Ohio. After moving to Port Clinton, Peiffer realized that there was no local radio station that broadcast local news, weather or high school sports.

Rather than start another traditional AM/FM station, which would require an FCC license, towers, high-powered transmitters and specialty power grids, Peiffer decided to enter into the fledgling industry of Internet radio.

After its first year on the web, WPCR had over 203,000 visitors in one month and had regular listeners not only in Ohio but also in 36 of the 50 U.S. states as well as an audience in Japan, Turkey, Iraq and Afghanistan.

References

Internet radio stations in the United States